Scisciano is a comune (municipality) in the Metropolitan City of Naples in the Italian region Campania, located about 20 km northeast of Naples. As of 31 December 2004, it had a population of 5,166 and an area of 5.5 km2.
The municipality of Scisciano contains the frazioni (subdivisions, mainly villages and hamlets) San Martino, Palazzuolo, Spartimento, and Frocia.

Scisciano borders the following municipalities: Marigliano, Nola, San Vitaliano, Saviano, Somma Vesuviana.

Demographic evolution

References

Cities and towns in Campania